Repudiation is the formal or informal act by which a husband renounces his wife in certain cultures and religions. For example:

 In Islam, a talaq divorce allows a woman or man to divorce their spouse (in Arabic, talaq), otherwise known as the formula of repudiation.
 In Babylonian law a husband could repudiate his wife, at the cost of returning the dowry.
 Repudiation is also a concept that existed in the Roman law
 In India, Section 13(2)(iv) of the Hindu Marriage Act and Section 2(vii) of the Dissolution of Muslim Marriages Act, 1939 gave young wives the option, within time limits, while Section 3(3) of the Prohibition of Child Marriage Act, 2006 gave both husbands and wives the choice, as well as a little more time to exercise it. Inconsistencies in the law are an issue in repudiation of marriage due to different age requirements.

See also
 Divorce
 :Category:Repudiated queens

References

Divorce